Andreas Hansen (born 11 August 1995) is a Danish professional footballer who plays as a goalkeeper for Danish Superliga club FC Nordsjælland.

Club career
He made his Danish Superliga debut for AaB on 20 June 2020 in a game against Nordsjælland.

On 27 January 2022, Hansen was sent on loan to league rivals Nordsjælland for the remainder of the 2021–22 season, with an option to buy. On 5 May 2022 Nordsjælland confirmed, that they had triggered the option and signed Hansen on a permanently deal.

References

External links
 

1995 births
Living people
Danish men's footballers
Denmark youth international footballers
Denmark under-21 international footballers
Association football goalkeepers
Brøndby IF players
HB Køge players
AaB Fodbold players
FC Nordsjælland players
Danish 1st Division players
Danish Superliga players
People from Brøndby Municipality
Sportspeople from the Capital Region of Denmark